Tanča Gora is a settlement in the hills southwest of Črnomelj in the White Carniola area of southeastern Slovenia. The area is part of the traditional region of Lower Carniola and is now included in the Southeast Slovenia Statistical Region.

There are two churches in the settlement. Both belong to the Parish of Dragatuš. One is dedicated to Saint Thomas and was first mentioned in written documents dating to 1526 and preserves its Gothic sanctuary. The second is dedicated to Saint Anne and was built in 1805 on the site of an earlier church.

References

External links
Tanča Gora on Geopedia

Populated places in the Municipality of Črnomelj